Wind and Cloud 2 is a Taiwanese television series based on Hong Kong artist Ma Wing-shing's manhua series Fung Wan. The series was first broadcast on CTV in Taiwan in 2004. Even though the series is marketed as a sequel to Wind and Cloud (2002), it was produced by a different company and is loosely connected to Wind and Cloud. Vincent Zhao and Peter Ho reprised their roles as the titular characters from the first series.

Plot
The series is based on the Heaven School story arc of the manhua series. A mysterious stranger wearing an ice mask approaches Nie Feng and tells him he has the ability to resurrect the dead. To everyone's surprise, the stranger revives Di-er Meng, Nie Feng's lover, who had died earlier. However, Nie Feng and Bu Jingyun gradually realise that they are falling under his control and being manipulated by him. The stranger, who claims to be a god and possesses supernatural powers, is revealed to be Dishitian, the leader of Heaven School, a martial arts school. Several well-known fighters have joined the Heaven School either out of fear of Dishitian or temptation by the rewards he offers.

Dishitian's intentions become clear later. He is planning to recruit the fighters – including Nie Feng and Bu Jingyun – who wield the seven most powerful weapons in the jianghu (martial artists' community) to join him in his quest to slay a dragon and obtain a precious Dragon Orb, which can boost a martial artist's inner energy by several times after consumption. The mission is successful but the Orb breaks into pieces and the fragments end up in different locations. In greed, Dishitian consumes more pieces than his body can take, and suffers severe internal injuries. His treacherous servant, Duan Lang, seizes the opportunity to kill him and absorb his powers. Duan Lang then morphs into the Qilin Demon and becomes a dangerous threat to the jianghu. Nie Feng and Bu Jingyun join forces to defeat Duan Lang.

Cast
 Vincent Zhao as Nie Feng
 Peter Ho as Bu Jingyun
 Huang Yi as Di-er Meng
 Qin Lan as Yu Chuchu
 Tammy Chen as Zining
 Chen Kuan-lin as Duan Lang
 Li Li-chun as Xu Fu
 Wei Yicheng as Dishitian
 Sun Xing as Xiongba
 Liu Weihua as Wuming
 Huang Jianuo as Jianchen
 Zheng Guolin as Huaimie
 Feng Shaofeng as Huaikong
 Yue Yueli as Tie Kuangtu
 Yang Rui as Bai Ling
 Li Xingyu as Luo Xian
 Pan Hong as Xiaosanxiao
 Zhu Hong as Yunling
 Wang Lu as Huangying
 Zhang Zhilü as Long'er
 Wang Jialin as Juexin

See also
 The Storm Riders
 The Storm Warriors
 Storm Rider Clash of the Evils
 Wind and Cloud

External links
  Wind and Cloud 2 on CTV's website
  Wind and Cloud 2 on Sina.com
  Wind and Cloud 2 on ATV's website

2004 Taiwanese television series debuts
2004 Taiwanese television series endings
Sequel television series
Fung Wan
Taiwanese wuxia television series
Adaptations of works by Ma Wing-shing
Television shows based on manhua